Nghi Sơn is a district-level town (thị xã) of Thanh Hóa province in the North Central Coast region of Vietnam.

Nghi Sơn was formerly Tĩnh Gia District, a rural district of Thanh Hóa Province, with its district capital lying at Tĩnh Gia township. On April 22, 2020, Tĩnh Gia District was dissolved to form the new district-level town of Nghi Sơn.

As of 2019 the town had a population of 307,304. The town covers an area of 455.61 km². The town seat lies at Hải Hòa (former Tĩnh Gia township).

Nghi Sơn Town is subdivided to 31 commune-level subdivisions, including 16 wards of: Bình Minh, Hải An, Hải Bình, Hải Châu, Hải Hòa, Hải Lĩnh, Hải Ninh, Hải Thanh, Hải Thượng, Mai Lâm, Nguyên Bình, Ninh Hải, Tân Dân, Tĩnh Hải, Trúc Lâm, Xuân Lâm and 15 rural communes of: Anh Sơn, Các Sơn, Định Hải, Hải Hà, Hải Nhân, Hải Yến, Nghi Sơn, Ngọc Lĩnh, Phú Lâm, Phú Sơn, Tân Trường, Thanh Sơn, Thanh Thủy, Trường Lâm, Tùng Lâm.

References

Districts of Thanh Hóa province
County-level towns in Vietnam
Populated places in Thanh Hóa province